Anastasia Dețiuc and Miriam Kolodziejová defeated Arantxa Rus and Tamara Zidanšek in the final, 1–6, 6–3, [10–8] to win the women's doubles tennis title at the 2022 Emilia-Romagna Open. This was both players' first WTA Tour doubles title.

Coco Gauff and Caty McNally were the reigning champions, but did not participate.

Seeds

Draw

Draw

References

External links
Main draw

2022 WTA Tour
Emilia-Romagna Open